Ho Ka Chi (born 16 July 2002) is a Hong Kong professional footballer who plays for Hong Kong Premier League club HK U23.

Career statistics

Club

Notes

References

Living people
2002 births
Hong Kong footballers
Hong Kong youth international footballers
Association football midfielders
Hong Kong Premier League players
TSW Pegasus FC players
HK U23 Football Team players